Koryo Tours Pyongyang Racer or Pyongyang Racer is a 2012 racing game developed by Nosotek and published by Koryo Tours. The player drives a Hwiparam II around Pyongyang and visits several of its sights while collecting fuel and avoiding other vehicles. The game was created as an advergame for Koryo Tours, a travel agency organising tours to North Korea, by the outsourcing company Nosotek in collaboration with students from the Kim Chaek University of Technology. As one of North Korea's few video games, Pyongyang Racer was released by Koryo Tours through its website in December 2012. Reviewers criticised the game's gameplay, graphics, controls, and music.

Gameplay 

Pyongyang Racer is set in Pyongyang, the capital of North Korea. The player controls a Hwiparam II-model car (of North Korean manufacturer Pyeonghwa Motors), using the WASD keys to accelerate, reverse and steer, as well as the space bar to sound the horn. They are tasked with driving along a pre-determined route around the city, starting and ending at Kim Il-sung Square, and visiting several of its sights, including the Ryugyong Hotel, Arch of Triumph, Chollima Statue, and Potong Gate. Passing a sight grants the player a stamp of the location and displays information about the object.

During their drive, the player has to repeatedly collect fuel tanks to counter an automatically depleting gauge. Colliding with stationary vehicles three times causes the game to reset. There are no pedestrians in the game. Steering onto the wrong side of the road sees the player reprimanded by traffic police, while driving off the street places them back onto it. The game records the time the player takes to complete the tour. Koryo Tours maintained a leaderboard of players' times and updated it when a player sent in a screenshot of their results via email.

Development and release 
Pyongyang Racer is one of few games developed in North Korea. It was reported as the first aimed at an international audience. The game was developed by Nosotek, a German–North Korean information technology company founded in 2007 and based in Pyongyang. One of the company's major operations was the development of mobile and Adobe Flash-based games on an outsourcing basis, several of which were released by the Berlin company Exozet in Germany. Games previously developed by Nosotek include The Big Lebowski Bowling, Men in Black: Alien Assault, and Bobby's Blocks. Pyongyang Racer was commissioned as an advergame by and for Koryo Tours, a British-run, Beijing-based travel agency that primarily organises tours to North Korea. The idea emerged when Koryo Tours' manager, Nick Bonner, asked Nosotek's Volker Eloesser for a "fun, nonviolent and nonpolitical" game designed alongside North Korean youths. With support from the government of North Korea, the developer worked with students from the Kim Chaek University of Technology to create Pyongyang Racer in Adobe Flash. According to the game's website, it was "not intended to be a high-end technological wonder hit game of the 21st century, but more a fun race game (arcade style)".

Koryo Tours released Pyongyang Racer via its website on 19 December 2012 at no cost and accessible worldwide. The game became popular among people interested in North Korea for its oddities, and the website had several outages in the days following the release.

Reception 
Pyongyang Racer was met with negative reviews: C. Custer of Tech in Asia criticised the "pretty awful" graphics as being "full of glitches and artefacts", also noting a repetitive scenery and low frame rate. Vices Nadja Sayej similarly lamented over the sparsely populated landscape, which she stated had "the visual dazzle of Saskatchewan or rural Ontario". Also citing the simple gameplay, summarised as "drive in a straight line for a long time", she called the game "profoundly uninteresting". Sayej concurred with Jason Torchinsky of Jalopnik, who perceived the game as "slow, wildly boring, empty, incredibly restricted, and at least a decade behind technologically". Custer described the gameplay as "terrible" for its lack of a challenge, slow speed, and poor vehicle handling. He further regarded the music as "hard not to laugh at", while Torchinsky called it "stunningly annoying and constant". Both stated that the game unintentionally felt like a parody or a sarcastic commentary on real-life Pyongyang.

References

External links 
 

2012 video games
Browser games
Kim Chaek University of Technology
Racing video games
Single-player video games
Tourism in Pyongyang
Video games developed in North Korea
Video games set in North Korea